Contact cleaner, also known as switch cleaner, is a term for a chemical, or a mixture of chemicals, intended to remove or prevent the build-up of oxides or other unwanted substances on the conductive surfaces of connectors, switches and other electronic components with moving surface contacts, and thus reduce the contact resistance encountered. The use of contact cleaner can help to minimise the wetting current across a pair of contacts.

An example of a simple contact cleaner is isopropyl alcohol.

Some contact cleaners are designed to evaporate completely and rapidly, leaving no residue. Others may contain lubricants. Lubricants themselves should not necessarily be used as contact cleaners, especially if they are designed to leave an unsuitable residue. However, appropriate lubricants may work well as contact cleaners.

References

Electronics
Household_chemicals